George Robert Walker (25 January 1942 – 4 March 2022) was a British educator who was director-general of the International Baccalaureate Organisation. He was also a productive author of articles and other works regarding international education and physical chemistry.

Walker studied chemistry at Oxford University, and music at the University of Cape Town in South Africa. He worked as a schoolteacher and headmaster at several British state schools, as well as a lecturer on education at the University of York. Between 1987 and 1988, he served as a member of the UK National Curriculum science working party. Between 1991 and 1999, he worked as the head of the International School of Geneva, the oldest and largest international school in the world. In 1999, he was appointed director-general of the IBO. In 2003 he was awarded an Honorary Doctor of Education from the University of Bath.

Walker retired as head of the IBO, and was replaced in office by Jeffrey Beard as of 2006. Beard kept the position until 2013, replaced by Dr. Siva Kumari.

Walker died on 4 March 2022, at the age of 80.

Bibliography 
 To Educate the Nations (2002)
 To Educate the Nations 2 (2004)

References

External links

1942 births
2022 deaths
British physical chemists
People educated at Watford Grammar School for Boys
South African College of Music alumni
International Baccalaureate